Vladimir Sushkov (born December 1, 1978) is a Russian Renju player. He won the Renju World Championships in 2009 and 2017, and the Renju Team World Championship in 2000, 2004 and 2006. Up to 2009, Vladimir Sushkov has won the Russian Renju Championship for 3 times.

References 

1978 births
Sushkov Vladimir
Sushkov Vladimir
Sushkov Vladimir